The Hampton Waterworks is a historic site located in Hampton, Arkansas. Completed in 1937, it is the only surviving example of a Public Works Administration-built waterworks in Calhoun County. The site contains a good example of a 1930s-era elevated steel water tower, built by the Pittsburgh-Des Moines Steel Company. The site was added to the National Register of Historic Places in 2006.

See also
Cotter water tower
Cotton Plant water tower
Mineral Springs Waterworks
National Register of Historic Places listings in Calhoun County, Arkansas

References

External links
An Ambition to be Preferred: New Deal Recovery Efforts and Architecture in Arkansas, 1933-1943, By Holly Hope

Industrial buildings and structures on the National Register of Historic Places in Arkansas
Infrastructure completed in 1937
Water supply infrastructure on the National Register of Historic Places
Public Works Administration in Arkansas
National Register of Historic Places in Calhoun County, Arkansas
Water towers on the National Register of Historic Places in Arkansas
1937 establishments in Arkansas
Waterworks